The Everglades are wetlands in southern Florida, USA.

Everglades may also refer to:

Places 
Australia
 Everglades, Leura, a historic property in Leura, New South Wales

United States
 Everglades City, Florida, a city in Collier County, Florida formerly named Everglades
 Everglades Airpark, a public-use airport in Collier County, Florida
 Everglades National Park, a national park in Southern Florida
 Vizcayne, an urban development in Miami, Florida (formerly known as Everglades on the Bay)
 Everglades Parkway, another name for Alligator Alley in Florida
 Port Everglades, a port in Broward County, Florida

Buildings 
 Bank of Everglades Building, an historic building in Everglades City, Florida 
 Everglades Laundry, an historic site in Everglades City, Florida
 Everglades Correctional Institution, a correctional centre opened in 1995

Schools 
 Everglades High School, a public school in Miramar, Florida
 Everglades University, a private college in Boca Raton, Florida
 Ransom Everglades School, a private school in Miami, Florida

Media 
 "Everglades", a song recorded by The Kingston Trio for their 1960 album String Along
 The Everglades (TV series), a 1961–62 syndicated U.S. TV show set in the Florida Everglades
 The Everglades: River of Grass, a 1947 non-fiction book by Marjory Stoneman Douglas

Other 
 Everglades Digital Library, a library in Miami, Florida
 Everglades Foundation, an environmental organization in Palmetto Bay, Florida
 Everglades Stakes, a former horse race in Hialeah, Florida
 Everglades virus, an alphavirus in the Venezuelan equine encephalitis virus complex
 USS Everglades (AD-24), a US Klondike-class destroyer tender
 Everglades (train), a passenger train with end points in Boston and Miami, run jointly by the Pennsylvania Railroad, the Atlantic Coast Line Railroad and others, into the 1960s

See also 
 Everglade (disambiguation)